The Young Americans Bank in 1987 was set up by Bill Daniels, an American cable television executive, after a group of elementary students in Denver, Colorado were denied a loan from other banks for a school project. 
Young Americans Bank is housed under Young Americans Center for Financial Education, a 501(c)3 non-profit that organizes programs such as Young AmeriTowne, International Towne, Get aHead for Business, summer camps, and Young Americans Bank, a for-profit, Federal Deposit Insurance Corporation-insured financial institution. The Bank is the world's only financial institution designed specifically for people under the age of 22. As a full service bank, YAB offers, among other financial products, savings accounts, checking accounts, certificates of deposit (CDs), and credit card accounts.

References

External links 
 Young Americans Website

Banks based in Colorado
Companies based in Denver
Banks established in 1987